Parallels (stylized as Para//èles) is a French science-fiction streaming television series about four teenage friends who are affected by a physics experiment which fractures spacetime, sending their lives in divergent directions. It was produced by Daïmôn Films and Empreinte Digitale for the Walt Disney Company. The series premiered on Disney+ on March 23, 2022 in France, the US, and other countries.

Plot  
Four lifelong friends preparing to start high school – Bilal, Romane, and brothers Sam and Victor – find their reality disrupted when the test of an experimental particle collider sends them into parallel worlds.

Cast and characters
 Thomas Chomel as Samuel "Sam" Deslandes – Victor's more responsible older brother. He has decided he wants a relationship with Romane.
 Jules Houplain as Victor Deslandes (17 years old)
 Maxime Bergeron as Victor Deslandes (13 years old) – Sam's mischievous younger brother. He skipped a grade to be in the same class as the others.
 Omar Mebrouk as Bilal Belkebirs (30 years old)
 Timoté Rigault as Bilal Belkebirs (14 years old) – He has a secret crush on Romane.
 Jade Pedri as Romane Berthauds (almost 18 years old)
 Victoria Eber as Romane Berthauds (14 years old) – She is protective of her mother and her little half-sister Camille.
 Naidra Ayadi as Sofia Belkebirs – Bilal's widowed mother. She is a scientist at the research facility connected to the incident.
 Guillaume Labbé as Lieutenant Retz – A police officer investigating the disappearances.
 Gil Alma as Arnaud Deslandes – Sam and Victor's father.
 Elise Diamant as Alice Deslandes – Sam and Victor's mother.
 Dimitri Storoge as Hervé Chassangre – Father of Romane's young half-sister Camille. He and Vanessa divorced years earlier, but he wants to reconcile.
 Agnès Miguras as Vanessa Chassangre – Romane and Camille's mother. She has a serious heart condition.

Episodes

Reception 
Joel Keller of Decider stated that the first episode manages to raise interest through its story, giving Parallels the potential to take many directions in the future in order to become an exciting science-fiction mystery show. Joly Herman of Common Sense Media rated the series 4 out of 5 stars, praised the show for promoting values such as love, loyalty, and persistence, complimented the positive role models, and found agreeable that the series has diversity among its cast members.

References

External links 
 
 
 Parallels at Crew United

Television shows filmed in France
2020s French television series
French-language television shows
Science fiction web series
French mystery television series
French fantasy television series
French adventure television series
Disney+ original programming
French web series
Television series about parallel universes
Television series about teenagers